1RXS is an acronym which is the prefix used for the First ROSAT X-ray Survey (1st ROSAT X-ray Survey). This is a catalogue of astronomical objects that were visible in the X-ray spectrum from the ROSAT satellite, in the field of X-ray astronomy.

Examinations of 1RXS has shown that many sources can be identified, such as old neutron stars, while other entries are "intriguing", according to one researcher.

See also
1RXS J160929.1−210524, example

References

External links
 Catalog site 

Astronomical surveys
X-ray astronomy
ROSAT objects